Datuk Wira Gan Boon Leong (25 August 1937–15 August 2022) was a Malaysian politician. He was a member of Malaysian Chinese Association (MCA), a component party of Barisan Nasional (BN).

Early life
Gan was born on 25 August 1937.

Political career
Gan started his political career by winning the Bandar Hilir state constituency seat and defeated Lim Kit Siang with a large majority in 1986. He subsequently won the seat in 1990. In 1995 and 1999, Gan won to Duyong state constituency seat. He was retired from politics in 2004.

Death
Gan was dead on 15 August 2022 due to old age.

Election results

References

1937 births
2022 deaths
Malaysian Chinese Association politicians
Members of the Malacca State Legislative Assembly